Vyacheslav Mikhailovich Markhayev (born June 1, 1955, Sharaldai, Bokhansky District, Irkutsk Oblast) is a Russian politician who is currently a member of parliament, a deputy of the State Duma since 2021, as he already served a member of the State Duma elected in 2011.

He had served as the Senator from Irkutsk Oblast on executive authority from 2015 to 2020. He was the First Secretary of the Buryat Communist Party.

Biography
Born in the family of a school teacher in  village  Sharaldai. In 1977 he graduated from the Buryat State University.

From 1980 to 2007 he worked in the internal affairs bodies. Founder and first commander of the Buryat riot police. He began his career in  Ministry of Internal Affairs with the district police officer and was promoted to deputy minister of  Ministry of Internal Affairs. In 2007, with the rank of colonel, he retired from service.

In December 2007, Markhayev became the deputy of the People's Khural of the Republic of Buryatia, the head of the Communist Party faction.

In 2011–2015, he was a deputy in the State Duma of the Federal Assembly of Russia, and a member of its Committee for Security and Anti-Corruption.

In 2017, Markhaev was nominated as one of the candidates for the head of Buryatia by Communist Party of the Russian Federation, but he could not overcome the municipal filter.

In 2019 he publicly condemned the heavy-handed police response to protests surrounding the 2019 Moscow City Duma election.

On March 11, 2020, he was the only member of the Federation Council of the Federal Assembly of the Russian Federation who voted against the amendments to the Russian Constitution. He spoke out against the Russia's "special military operation" in Ukraine, although his criticisms only refer to Russia's military campaign outside of Donbass, while he fully supports the narrative that Ukraine is governed by "neo-Nazis".

He is one of the 324 members of the State Duma the United States Treasury sanctioned on 24 March 2022 in response to the 2022 Russian invasion of Ukraine.

References

External links
 Только один сибирский сенатор не одобрил пенсионную реформу
 Вячеслав Мархаев — главные новости о персоне

1955 births
Living people
People from Irkutsk Oblast
Buryat politicians
Communist Party of the Russian Federation members
Sixth convocation members of the State Duma (Russian Federation)
Eighth convocation members of the State Duma (Russian Federation)
Members of the Federation Council of Russia (after 2000)
Buryat State University alumni
Russian individuals subject to the U.S. Department of the Treasury sanctions